Huángfŭ (皇甫), alternatively pronounced Huangpu, is a Chinese compound surname. It's also called as Hwangbo (황보) in Korea and Hoàng Phủ in Vietnam.

Origins
In the early Zhou Dynasty, Huangfu is the name of Military Office of Zhou Dynasty period, the officer's descendants appended his name to their own to commemorate him, and thus the surname was born. In the middle Zhou Dynasty, some noble of Zheng (state) became Officer of Zhou Dynasty Government. Thus, Post Huangfu (皇甫) family founded in from descendant of Wu Ji (武子) of Zheng (state). Some Huangfu (皇甫) family founded in Song (state) in Zhou Dynasty at period.

Notable persons surnamed Huangfu
 Huangfu Song (?–195), Eastern Han dynasty military general 
 Huangfu Mi (215–282), Cao Wei and Western Jin Dynasty scholar and physician
 Huangfu Zhen (fl. 4th century), Former Yan official
 Huangfu Ji (皇甫績) (541-592), Sui Dynasty official.
 Huangfu Ran (714? – 767?), Tang dynasty poet 
 Huangfu Bo (died 820), Tang dynasty chancellor
 Huangfu Chong (皇甫冲) (1490-1558), Ming Dynasty poet, one of the Four Paragons of the Huangfu Clan.
 Huangfu Xiao (皇甫涍) (1497-1556), Ming Dynasty poet and politician, one of the Four Paragons of the Huangfu Clan.
 Huangfu Fang (皇甫汸) (1504-1584), Ming Dynasty poet and official, one of the Four Paragons of the Huangfu Clan.
 Huangfu Lian (皇甫濂)（31 October 1508 - 2 November 1564), Ming Dynasty politician of Jinshi origin, one of the Four Paragons of the Huangfu Clan.
 Huangfu Duan, fictional character in Water Margin

Notable persons surnamed Hwangbo
 Hwangbo Je-gong (황보제공 皇甫悌恭), father of Queen Sinjeong and one of Three Major Grand Masters (태위 삼중대광, 太尉 三重大匡).
 Queen Sinjeong (신정왕후 황보씨; 神靜王后 皇甫氏), Taejo of Goryeo's 4th Queen Consort
 Queen Daemok (대목왕후 황보씨; 大穆王后 皇甫氏), Gwangjong of Goryeo's Queen Consort
 Hwangbo In (황보인; 皇甫仁), Prime Minister of Joseon from 1450 to 1453
 Hwangbo Kwan (황보관; 皇甫官) (b. March 1, 1965), a footballer
 Hwangbo Seung-hee (황보승희; 皇甫承希) (b. 5 August 1976), South Korean politician, Youth Chief of the People Power Party.
 Hwangbo Hyejeong (황보혜정; 皇甫惠貞) (b. 16 August 1980), South Korean singer and rapper

Notable persons surnamed Hoàng Phủ
 Hoàng Phủ Ngọc Tường (born 1937), Vietnamese writer.

References

See also
Hwangbo (Korean name)

Chinese-language surnames
Individual Chinese surnames